Brassac-les-Mines (Auvergnat: Braçac) is a commune in the Puy-de-Dôme department in Auvergne-Rhône-Alpes in central France. It is the seat of the canton of Brassac-les-Mines.

Population

See also 

 Communes of the Puy-de-Dôme department

References 

Communes of Puy-de-Dôme